Push is the second album by the American grunge band Gruntruck. It was released in 1992 by Roadrunner Records. The album contains "Tribe", "Crazy Love", and "Above Me", which were released as singles. "Tribe" was the highest-charting single of the band's career. The band supported the album by touring with Alice in Chains and Screaming Trees.

Production
Recorded at Seattle's Red Farm Films studio, the album was produced by Jack Endino and Gary King. It cost 12,000 to record.

Critical reception

The Washington Post noted that "the hooks to songs such as 'Machine Action' and 'Crazy Love' recall Nirvana, a perhaps unwelcome but nonetheless accurate comparison." Billboard wrote that Gruntruck "may not have the musical moxie to push them above [Seattle's] wall of grunge, but they're capable of dishing out some decent songs with coherent melodies, effective arrangements and a good measure of passion."

USA Today praised the production of Endino, writing that "most of the ditties encourage a unique brand of booty shakin', not headbanging." The Seattle Times deemed the album "grunge-meets-psychedelia."

Accolades

Track listing 
All tracks composed by Ben McMillan excepted where noted.

Personnel
 Ben McMillan - vocals, guitar
 Tom Niemeyer - guitar
 Tim Paul - bass
 Norman Scott - drums

References

Gruntruck albums
1992 albums
Roadrunner Records albums
Albums produced by Jack Endino